John D'Aquino (born April 14, 1958) is an American film and television actor, best known for his role as Lieutenant Benjamin Krieg in seaQuest DSV, Joel in the film Pumpkinhead, U.S. President Richard Martinez in the Disney Channel Original Series Cory in the House, and for his appearance as Ulysses in Xena. He is also known for his roles as Frank LaMotta in Quantum Leap, Todd Gack in "The Calzone" episode of Seinfeld, and playing Sally's teacher boyfriend, Mr. Randell, in 3rd Rock from the Sun.

Early life 
Born in Brooklyn, D'Aquino was raised there and in Queens. In his childhood, he was a "self-admitted TV junkie." As a child, D'Aquino used to memorize every page of TV Guide.

Career 
In 1985 he co-starred as Varges de la Cosa in the western series Wildside. In 1992 he co-starred as Bill in the TV movie Stompin' at the Savoy Stompin' at the savoy.

He has made guest appearances on Baywatch, Magnum P.I., Matlock, Melrose Place, Murder, She Wrote, Seinfeld, Sliders, Xena: Warrior Princess, Crossing Jordan, Hannah Montana, Monk, Shake It Up, Lois and Clark: The New Adventures of Superman and had recurring roles on 3rd Rock from the Sun, JAG, Quantum Leap, and co-starred in Comedy Central's That's My Bush! as Larry O'Shea.

Filmography

Film

Television

References

External links
 John D'Aquino's Young Actors Workshop
 

1958 births
Living people
20th-century American male actors
21st-century American male actors
Male actors from New York City
American male film actors
American male television actors
People from Brooklyn
American people of Italian descent